Michael Vincent Jones (born July 24, 1987) is an American actor, podcast host and internet personality who is known for his work with Rooster Teeth's gameplay division Achievement Hunter.  He also co-hosted three-time Podcast Award winner Internet Box.

Jones has worked extensively with Rooster Teeth, having also starred in the second and third seasons of Immersion, the comedy murder mystery series Ten Little Roosters, and voices the character Sun Wukong in Rooster Teeth's RWBY, and Max in Camp Camp. He starred in Rooster Teeth's science fiction action comedy film Lazer Team, released in 2016, as well as its sequel the following year.

His work outside of Rooster Teeth includes voicing Sting Eucliffe in Fairy Tail, Dogra in One Piece, Rapture in Ninja Slayer From Animation, and Gen in World Break: Aria of Curse for a Holy Swordsman.

Career

After graduating from high school, Jones worked as an electrician for almost five years. Jones first came to attention after his video "Crackdown 2 – Orbs = Bullshit" reached the front page of reddit. He received an email from Rooster Teeth asking him to join and make a new show for Achievement Hunter, which became Rage Quit. In September 2011, he co-founded the triple award-winning Internet Box podcast hosted by himself, Barbara Dunkelman, Ray Narvaez, Jr., Andrew Blanchard, Mike Kroon, and Dylan "Dylon" Saramago, with Lindsay Jones and Kerry Shawcross being added to the cast later on.  He is an occasional guest on the Rooster Teeth Podcast and is currently the main host of the Achievement Hunter podcast Off Topic and co-host of Face Jam along with Jordan Cwierz. In 2022 Jones participated in State Farm’s The Gamerhood Challenge.

Jones has worked as both an actor and a voice artist in multiple projects, several of which are produced by Rooster Teeth. For Rooster Teeth's animated productions, he has voiced Sun Wukong in RWBY, lead character Max in Camp Camp, and Mogar in X-Ray and Vav. He has also portrayed live-action fictionalized versions of himself in both Rooster Teeth Shorts andTen Little Roosters, as well as Zach in the sci-fi comedy film Lazer Team and Lazer Team 2. He has co-starred in the Rooster Teeth series Immersion since season two. His non-Rooster Teeth credits include the animated shows Fairy Tail, as Sting Eucliffe, and World Break: Aria of Curse for a Holy Swordsman, as Gen. On October 1, 2016, Jones announced via Twitter that he will be playing Dogra in One Piece.

The creator of the video game Surgeon Simulator named the alien character Gworb after a remark made by Jones in a Let's Play video in which Jones was conversing with Gavin Free. In addition Gworb has an organ known as the "Gavichal", which is a combination of Michael Jones' and Gavin Free's names.

Personal life

Jones was born in Woodbridge, New Jersey to "devout Roman Catholic parents."

On May 9, 2014, Jones married his long-time romantic partner and Rooster Teeth voice actor Lindsay Tuggey. During Rooster Teeth's 2016 Extra Life livestream, the couple announced that they are expecting a child, which was later revealed to be a girl in January 2017. They announced the birth of their daughter, Iris Elise Jones, born May 24, 2017. On August 5, 2018, Jones announced at RTX 2018 that he and Lindsay were expecting their second child in February 2019. Luna Claire Jones was born February 18, 2019.

Filmography

Film

Television

Web

Video games

References

External links

 
 

1987 births
Living people
American male film actors
American male voice actors
American male web series actors
American YouTubers
Male actors from Austin, Texas
Male actors from New Jersey
Rooster Teeth people
Screenwriters from Texas
21st-century American male actors
21st-century American screenwriters